Qatar Tribune is an English-language newspaper published in Doha, Qatar with local and international coverage. It was launched in 2006. The newspapers motto is "First with the News and What's Behind it". Qatar Tribune is published by Qatar Information and Marketing (QIM), as are its sister Arabic-language newspaper Al-Watan. Qatar Tribune has also online version.

The newspaper is sub-divided into five sections: Main (which features latest local and international happenings), Nation, Business, Sports, and a section entitled "Chillout".

References

External links
Qatar Tribune website

2006 establishments in Qatar
Publications established in 2006
Mass media in Doha
English-language newspapers published in Qatar